Dexter Young (a.k.a. Yeung Tin-king, born 25 March 1975) is a Hong Kong actor who joined TVB in 2007. He is the son of well-known Hong Kong actress Connie Chan.

He joined the local entertainment industry in 2001 after earning a bachelor's degree in economics from the University of Texas at Austin, and have since been an actor on stage and on TV.

Theatre
 Forever Teresa Teng (2002) 
 Love During the Epidemic (2004) 
 Dance Again (2005)
 A Sentimental Journey (2005)

Filmography

References

1975 births
Hong Kong male actors
Living people
TVB actors
University of Texas at Austin College of Liberal Arts alumni